Hermann Köhler (born 12 January 1950 in Niedermarsberg, North Rhine-Westphalia) is a former sprinter who specialized in the 400 metres. He represented West Germany and competed for the club TV Wattenscheid.

Achievements

References

1950 births
Living people
People from Marsberg
Sportspeople from Arnsberg (region)
West German male sprinters
Athletes (track and field) at the 1972 Summer Olympics
Olympic athletes of West Germany
European Athletics Championships medalists